Bucyrus is an unincorporated community in Miami County, Kansas, United States. As of the 2020 census, the population of the community and nearby areas was 171. It is part of the Kansas City metropolitan area.

History
The post office in Bucyrus was established in May 1887.  Bucyrus currently has a post office with ZIP code 66013.

Demographics

For statistical purposes, the United States Census Bureau has defined Bucyrus as a census-designated place (CDP).

Notable people
 Garrett Price, cartoonist and illustrator for The New Yorker, born in Bucyrus

References

Further reading

External links
 USD 416, local school district
 Miami County maps: Current, Historic, KDOT

Census-designated places in Miami County, Kansas
Census-designated places in Kansas